Church of the Immaculate Conception and the Michael Ferrall Family Cemetery is a historic Roman Catholic church and cemetery at 145 S. King Street in Halifax, Halifax County, North Carolina.  The church was designed by noted Philadelphia architect Edwin Forrest Durang, and built in 1889.  The church is basically a rectangular gable-front Late Gothic Revival style frame building, 20 feet wide and 37 feet deep.  It features a pair of asymmetrical projecting corner towers and lancet-arch window openings.  Adjacent to the cemetery is the Michael Ferrall Family Cemetery, which contains the Michael Ferrall Family Vault built in 1859. The church is one of only two churches still standing that were built by Servant of God Thomas Frederick Price, the first native North Carolinian to become a Catholic priest.

It was listed on the National Register of Historic Places in 1997.

References

Roman Catholic churches in North Carolina
Cemeteries in North Carolina
Roman Catholic cemeteries in the United States
Roman Catholic Diocese of Raleigh
Churches on the National Register of Historic Places in North Carolina
Roman Catholic churches completed in 1889
Carpenter Gothic church buildings in North Carolina
National Register of Historic Places in Halifax County, North Carolina
Churches in Halifax County, North Carolina
Buildings and structures in Halifax, North Carolina
1889 establishments in North Carolina
19th-century Roman Catholic church buildings in the United States